Penlee Lifeboat Station is the base for Royal National Lifeboat Institution (RNLI) search and rescue operations for Mount's Bay in Cornwall, United Kingdom. The lifeboat station operated at various locations in Penzance from the early 19th century. It moved to Penlee Point near Mousehole in 1913, thus gaining its current name, but was moved to Newlyn in 1983 without any change of name. The station is remembered for the loss of the entire lifeboat crew on 19 December 1981.

Since 2003 the station has operated a  all weather boat (ALB) and an Atlantic-class (currently an ) inshore lifeboat (ILB).

History

Early locations
The first lifeboat in Cornwall was purchased for Penzance in 1803. Part of its cost was paid by Lloyd's of London but it was sold, in 1812, without ever being used in service and was not replaced. In 1824 a district association was formed as part of the National Institution for the Preservation of Life from Shipwreck and the next lifeboat in Mount's Bay was again stationed at Penzance from 1826 to 1828 by the recently formed Institution.

The station then lapsed until 1851, when a lifeboat was again stationed in the town. The boat was kept at several different places around the town until a boathouse was built in 1856, for £88, by the RNLI (as the Institution was now known), at what is now the entrance to the railway station. There was local controversy when the boat did not launch on several occasions in 1862, and as a consequence, there was a proposal to move the lifeboat to Newlyn, which would have been unpopular with the residents of Penzance. As a compromise the lifeboat station moved to Wherrytown, where a new timber lifeboat house was opened in 1867 at the bottom of Alexandra Road, near the Coastguard Station. It was decided to move back to Penzance harbour, and in 1884 a new boathouse built of Lamorna granite at the foot of Jennings Street, at a cost of £575–6s–6d. This was paid for by a £1,000 gift from Henry Martn Harvey of Hexworthy, which also paid for a new lifeboat (Dora) and carriage. In 1908, the Penzance Lifeboat Elizabeth and Blanche was moved to Newlyn, where it was kept under a tarpaulin beside the harbour, although the 1884 boathouse remained in use until 1917 as a reserve station.

At Penlee Point

The lifeboat remained at Newlyn until 1913, when a new boathouse was built at Penlee Point south of Newlyn on the outskirts of Mousehole. This was elevated a little above the water, and the lifeboat could be launched down a slipway into open water at all states of the tide. The old "pulling and sailing" lifeboat was replaced by one with a motor in 1922. Several similar motor lifeboats were to follow, culminating in the Solomon Browne, a wooden, twin engined,  boat that arrived at the station in 1960.

In 1936, Coxswain Frank Blewitt was awarded a RNLI bronze medal for rescuing the crew of nine from the SS Taycraig after it ran aground in Mount's Bay during a gale. Coxswain Edwin Madron received a silver medal and Mechanic Johny Drew a bronze medal for another exceptional service in April 1947. Madron was the subject of This Is Your Life in 1957 when he was surprised by Eamonn Andrews at a theatre in London. In the introduction the audience was told that although Madron 'has snatched so many lives from the cruel sea, that same sea has claimed his father and son'. He was told that the programme was dedicated 'as a tribute not only to you but to the thousands who man the lifeboats of Britain.'

A helicopter saved two people but the rest were drowned. The lifeboat had to drop the safety rails around its deck so that the bodies could be hauled out of the sea, all while the boat was rolling side-to-side at 60˚ and the seas were washing across the boat. They were at sea for nearly eight hours. The coxswain, Trevelyan Richards, was awarded a RNLI bronze medal.

The loss of the Solomon Browne

On board the Union Star was a crew of five, and three members of the captain's family. A helicopter had been unable to rescue them and so the lifeboat with its crew of eight men went alongside. After several attempts four people managed to jump across; the captain's family and one of the men were apparently safe. The lifeboat radioed that 'we’ve got four off'; that was the last ever heard from anyone on either vessel.

The Sennen Cove Lifeboat found it impossible to make headway round Land's End. The Lizard Lifeboat found a serious hole in its hull when it finally returned to its slipway after a fruitless search. Wreckage from the Solomon Browne was found along the shore, and the Union Star lay capsized onto the rocks west of Tater Du Lighthouse. Some, but not all, of the 16 bodies were eventually recovered.

Within a day of the disaster enough people from Mousehole had volunteered to form a new lifeboat crew. Coxswain Trevelyan Richards was posthumously awarded the RNLI gold medal, while the remainder of the crew were all posthumously awarded bronze medals. The station itself was awarded a gold medal service plaque. The disaster prompted a massive public appeal for the benefit of the village of Mousehole which raised over £3 million (£ as of ), although there was an outcry when the government tried to tax the donations.

The move to Newlyn

After the loss of the Solomon Browne, the Penlee Point station remained in use until 1983 when the Mabel Alice, larger, faster  all-weather lifeboat (ALB) was acquired, and a new lifeboat station constructed at Newlyn harbour, where the new lifeboat is kept afloat at a mooring. Despite the move, the station continues to be known as 'Penlee'.

In 1991, a  inshore lifeboat (ILB) was stationed on the opposite side of Mount's Bay at Marazion (although it was actually kept at St Michael's Mount). It proved difficult to find enough volunteer crews in this small village, so in 2001 the station was closed and a larger B Class boat was added to the complement at Penlee, with a new boathouse built to house it. The following year a new pontoon was built in Newlyn harbour so that crews could board the ALB more easily.

On 16 December 1994, the Mabel Alice and the Sennen Cove Lifeboat were launched to the aid of the Julian Paul which was adrift in a storm west of the Longships. The fishing boat's propeller had been fouled and she was towed back to Newlyn harbour. Neil Brockman, the Coxswain/Mechanic of the Penlee Lifeboat, was awarded a RNLI bronze medal for his seamanship, leadership and meritorious conduct, as was Terry George, his counterpart from Sennen Cove.

In 2003, the Ivan Ellen, a new  ALB, was acquired by the station to replace its Arun-class predecessor. In 2016, the stations capability was further enhanced with the introduction of a replacement  ILB, the Mollie & Ivor Dent.

Buildings

The 1856- and 1867-built boathouses no longer exist, but the 1884-built boathouse still stands at the corner of Wharf Road and Jennings Street in Penzance. It is separated from the harbour by Wharf Road and now houses a bistro.

The 1913-built boathouse at Penlee Point is built into the cliffs below the Newlyn to Mousehole road. It is a single-storey building with a short slipway. It launched boats into Mount's Bay facing St Michael's Mount. Although no boat is now stationed here, the boathouse is still maintained and a small memorial garden has been created on the north side of the boathouse where people can sit and remember the crew of the Solomon Browne.

The new station at Newlyn harbour comprises two buildings. The main one, which houses the crew facilities, workshop, and fund-raising gift shop, is a single-storey masonry structure with a tile roof. The ALB berth is alongside a modern pontoon that is accessed by a metal truss walkway. A separate masonry and corrugated metal boathouse contains the ILB, which is launched from a shallow slipway by its entrance.

Lifeboats
'ON' is the RNLI's sequential Official Number; 'Op. No.' is the operational number painted onto the boat.

Pulling and sailing lifeboats

Motor lifeboats

Inshore lifeboats

See also

 Royal National Lifeboat Institution
 List of RNLI stations
 List of shipwrecks of Cornwall

References

External links
 
 Lifeboat station listing (1884–1917)
 RNLI station information

Lifeboat stations in Cornwall
Newlyn